Weekly Rest (Commerce and Offices) Convention, 1957 is  an International Labour Organization Convention.

It was established in 1957, with the preamble stating:
Having decided upon the adoption of certain proposals with regard to weekly rest in commerce and offices, ...

Ratifications
As of 2017, the convention has been ratified by 63 states.

See also 
Weekly Rest (Industry) Convention, 1921

External links 
Text.
Ratifications.

International Labour Organization conventions
Working time
Treaties entered into force in 1959
Treaties concluded in 1957
Treaties of the Kingdom of Afghanistan
Treaties of the People's Republic of Angola
Treaties of Azerbaijan
Treaties of Bangladesh
Treaties of the Byelorussian Soviet Socialist Republic
Treaties of Bolivia
Treaties of Bosnia and Herzegovina
Treaties of the military dictatorship in Brazil
Treaties of the People's Republic of Bulgaria
Treaties of Cameroon
Treaties of Colombia
Treaties of the Comoros
Treaties of Costa Rica
Treaties of Cuba
Treaties of Croatia
Treaties of Cyprus
Treaties of Denmark
Treaties of Djibouti
Treaties of the Dominican Republic
Treaties of the United Arab Republic
Treaties of Ecuador
Treaties of the People's Democratic Republic of Ethiopia
Treaties of France
Treaties of Gabon
Treaties of Ghana
Treaties of Greece
Treaties of Guatemala
Treaties of Guinea-Bissau
Treaties of Haiti
Treaties of Honduras
Treaties of Indonesia
Treaties of Pahlavi Iran
Treaties of the Iraqi Republic (1958–1968)
Treaties of Israel
Treaties of Italy
Treaties of Jordan
Treaties of Kuwait
Treaties of Kyrgyzstan
Treaties of Latvia
Treaties of Lebanon
Treaties of Malta
Treaties of Mexico
Treaties of Montenegro
Treaties of Morocco
Treaties of the Netherlands
Treaties of Pakistan
Treaties of Paraguay
Treaties of Peru
Treaties of the Estado Novo (Portugal)
Treaties of the Soviet Union
Treaties of São Tomé and Príncipe
Treaties of Saudi Arabia
Treaties of Serbia and Montenegro
Treaties of Slovenia
Treaties of Francoist Spain
Treaties of Sri Lanka
Treaties of Suriname
Treaties of Tajikistan
Treaties of North Macedonia
Treaties of Tunisia
Treaties of the Ukrainian Soviet Socialist Republic
Treaties of Uruguay
Treaties extended to the Faroe Islands
Treaties extended to Greenland
Treaties extended to Aruba
Treaties extended to the Netherlands Antilles
1957 in labor relations